Sprengplatz Grunewald is the name of an area of about  square, located in the Grunewald forest, in Berlin. It is part of Nikolassee, of Steglitz-Zehlendorf. Since 1950, the area is used to store ammunition. It is also used for detonating ammunition, in a controlled setting. The site also accepts ammunition that has been found, and that needs to be removed safely. Berlin Police have a special unit responsible for this.

Use 

The site was created in 1950, mainly to safely dispose of ammunition found after the Second World War. At the time, most were unexploded bombs found around the city. In the 2020s, there are between six and eight large detonation events per year. There are also about seventy smaller blast events, per year. The latter are mainly used to safely dispose of unexploded ordnances, as well as for training. In 2004, operating the site cost around a million euros; in 2022, operation expenses were about half a million Euros.

Situation 
When the site is used for larger-scale detonations, this also means that a section of the highway is closed, for safety reasons.

Fire 
There was an unintended detonation at the site, in the morning hours of August 4, 2022. This detonation caused other explosions, which put the surrounding forest on fire. Because of very dry weather conditions, the fire spread. Because of the fire, several lines of Berlin S-Bahn were disrupted. Longer range trains had to be diverted, the Avus highway was closed. In the afternoon of August 6, railway lines could again operate normally, but the highway remained closed.

The fire also led to a public discussion, whether a site such as Sprengplatz Grunewald should really be near a site which many people use for recreation, and which is near traffic axes such as Wetzlarer Bahn and Avus. Current city mayor, Franziska Giffey said that moving the site to Brandenburg should be contemplated.

External websites 

 Vortrag des Berliner Landeskriminalamtes (LKA KT 63) auf stadtentwicklung.berlin.de (PDF; 7,3 MB), retrieved 23 October 2013
 Private Fotosammlung auf forst-grunewald.de, retrieved 3 June 2011

References 

Ammunition dumps